Castiglione Tinella is a comune (municipality) in the Province of Cuneo in the Italian region Piedmont, located about  southeast of Turin and about  northeast of Cuneo.

References

External links
 Official website

Cities and towns in Piedmont